This is a list of notable Senior Advocate of Nigeria, SAN, arranged in alphabetical order.

A

 Adedipe Ayodeji
[]], Founder and Chancellor,  University,United Kingdow 
 Eyimofe Atake Senior Advocate of Nigeria
 Abubakar Malami, current Minister of Justice and Attorney General of the Federal Republic of Nigeria
 Solomon Adun Asemota is a Nigerian lawyer. Mohammed zakariya Umar future naval officer

B
Bayo Ojo, former Attorney General of the Federal Republic of Nigeria.
[ameh samuel], present chief justice of the Federal Republic of Nigeria high ranked
Babatunde Raji Fashola, former Executive Governor of Lagos State
Bola Ajibola, former Attorney General of the Federal Republic of Nigeria.
Bolaji Owasanoye, Chairman of the Independent Corrupt Practices and other Related Offences Commission, ICPC
Bankole Akintoye Sodipo

C 
Chimezie Ikeazor is a Nigerian lawyer

D
Damilola Sunday Olawuyi, Professor of Law and Deputy Vice Chancellor, Afe Babalola University, Ado Ekiti

E
Ernest Ojukwu, Professor of Law, former Deputy Director-General and Head Nigerian Law School
Eyitayo Jegede, Former Attorney General and Commissioner for Justice Ondo State
 Ebun-Olu Adegboruwa, political commentator.
 Edoba Omoregie, Professor of Law at the University of Benin
 Efecha Leo Akpofure 
 Emeka Chijioke Ogugua Precious
Emeka Jude-phillipe Obegolu
 Esan Makanjuola
 Ezebilo Chidube

F
Femi Falana, Political activist.
Folake Solanke
 Funke Aboyade
Frederick Rotimi Williams  (16 December 1920 – 26 March 2005) was a Nigerian lawyer.
Fabian Ajogwu is a Nigerian lawyer and a senior partner at Kenna Partners
Festus Keyamo  (21 January 1970) became Nigeria's Minister of State for Niger Delta Affairs on 21 August 2019.

G
Gani Fawehinmi (22 April 1938 – 5 September 2009) was a Nigerian author, publisher and human right activist
Gbolahan Elias

H
Henry Odein Ajumogobia (born 29 June 1956) was former Nigerian minister of Foreign Affairs.

I

 Isa Hayatu Chiroma

J
Josephine Aladi Achor Agbonika
Kanu Godwin Agabi, Nigerian lawyer and politician who was a National Senator  Attorney-General of the Federation

K

• Kabiru Tanimu Turaki, Nigerian Lawyer and Politician. The first Senior Advocate of Nigeria from Kebbi State and former Minister of Special Duties and Intergovernmental Affairs, Former Supervising Minister, Federal Ministry of Labour and Productivity having served from 2013- 2015 and 2014 - 2015.

L
Lateef Olufemi Okunnu (born 19 February 1933, Lagos State, Nigeria) is a Nigerian Lawyer

M
Muiz Banire,  Chairman, Asset Management Corporation of Nigeria and formal National Legal Adviser [APC]
Mike Ozekhome, Constitutional lawyer and human rights activist

O
 Olisa Agbakoba (Born 29 May 1953) is a Nigerian lawyer.
 Obafemi Awolowo GCFR, (6 March 1909 – 9 May 1987) was a lawyer, educational administrator, publisher and politician
 Oluwarotimi Odunayo Akeredolu, former President of the Nigerian Bar Association
 Okey Wali, the 26th President of the Nigerian Bar Association.
 Okoro Edwin Okechukwu 
 Ogungbade Oluwasina Olanrewaju
 Olawale Fapohunda, Attorney General of Ekiti State

P
Paul Usoro (7 September 1958) is a Nigerian litigator and 29th President of the Nigerian Bar Association

R
Richard Akinjide, lawyer and human right activist.
 Rotimi Akeredolu, former President Nigeria  Bar Association and Governor of Ondo state.

S
Idowu Sofola SAN, MON (29 September 1934) is a Nigerian Jurist, Bencher and former President of the Nigerian Bar Association. He was formerly the Chairman of the Nigerian Body of Benchers.
Kayode Sofola is a Nigerian jurist and former Chairman of United Bank for Africa.

U
 Umeh Philip Ndubuisi Evaristus
 Ugboduma Johnson Tarigho Omophe
 Uzuegbu Benjamin Chukwudi

V
Victor Ndoma-Egba, a Nigerian politician and member of the national senate.

W
Wole Olanipekun, a constitutional lawyer.
Wale Babalaki, Former Pro-chancellor and Head of Governing council of the renowned University of lagos.

X

Y
Yusuf Olaolu Ali is a Nigerian lawyer.
Yemi Osinbajo, SAN is a Nigeria professor of Law, former Solicitor General and Attorney-General of Lagos State, Nigeria, current vice president of Nigeria under President Buhari (29 May 2015 - Current)
Yemi Akinseye George, SAN (Born, 1963 Ekiti State, Nigeria) is a Nigeria professor of Public law and President of the Center for Socio-Legal Studies

Z

References

Lists of Nigerian people